Oddvar Ingolf Hansen (11 April 1921 – 31 March 2011) was a Norwegian footballer and coach, who represented Brann in his hometown Bergen.

As a player, Hansen was a right-back who played 238 first-team games for Brann between 1940 and 1956. He was a losing cup finalist in 1950. He also won 19 caps for Norway between 1948 and 1954, and was a member of Norway's squad at the 1952 Olympics, but he did not play in any matches.

As a coach, Hansen became player-coach of Brann in 1955 when he took over from Englishman George Ainsley. He had three spells as Brann's head coach (1955–57, 1960–63 and 1965–68), and is best remembered for leading the club to consecutive league titles in 1962 and 1963. The 1963 title would turn out to be Brann's last league championship in 44 years, until the drought came to an end in 2007.

In addition to his achievements in football, Hansen was also an excellent table tennis player, who became national champion in 1947. He died on 31 March 2011, less than two weeks before what would have been his 90th birthday.

References

1921 births
2011 deaths
Norwegian footballers
Norwegian football managers
Norway international footballers
SK Brann players
SK Brann managers
Footballers from Bergen
Association football defenders
20th-century Norwegian people